Letters of Transit is a Canadian short drama film, directed by Manon Briand and released in 1991. The film stars Julie Lavergne, Patrick Goyette and Luc Picard as Alice, Hubert and Marc, three people who become drawn into a love triangle while participating in a community attempt to establish a world record for egg tossing.

At the 1992 Rendez-vous Québec Cinéma, Briand won the Bourse Claude-Jutra for Most Promising Young Director, and Picard won the Prix Luce-Guilbault for Most Promising Young Actor. In 1992 the film won Canada's Golden Sheaf Awards for  Best Drama Over 30 Minutes and Best Director at the Yorkton Film Festival. The film was later screened at the 1992 Toronto International Film Festival, where it won the award for Best Canadian Short Film.

References

External links
 

1991 films
Canadian LGBT-related short films
1991 LGBT-related films
1991 short films
Films directed by Manon Briand
1990s French-language films
French-language Canadian films
Canadian drama short films
1990s Canadian films